Jealousy is an album released in 1981 by the Dirt Band (a.k.a. Nitty Gritty Dirt Band). It reached #102 on the US album charts. The single "Fire in the Sky" reached #76 on the US singles chart.

Track listing
"Jealousy" (Holster, Hanna, Carpenter) – 3:38
"Too Close For Comfort" (Hanna, Hathaway, Carpenter) – 3:05
"Fire in the Sky" (Carpenter, Hanna) – 4:37
"Love is the Last Thing" (Hanna, Hathaway, Carpenter) – 3:42
"Crossfire" (Hanna, Carpenter) – 4:02
"Circular Man" (Fadden, Carpenter, Hanna) – 3:46
"Catch the Next Dream" (Silbar, Lorber, Van Stephenson) – 3:22
"So You Run" (Holster, Carpenter) – 3:18
"Forget It!" (Hathaway, Hanna, Carpenter) – 3:09
"Easy Slow" (Hathaway, Hanna, Carpenter) – 4:26

Personnel
Jeff Hanna – rhythm and lead guitar, vocals
Jimmie Fadden – harmonica, vocals
John McEuen – acoustic guitar, electric 12-string guitar, lap steel guitar, 5-string banjo
Bob Carpenter – keyboards, rhythm guitar on "Crossfire", vocals
Richard Hathaway – bass guitar
Al Garth – saxophone, violin

Additional musicians
Rick Shlosser – drums
M. L. Benoit – congas, percussion
Steve Lukather – lead guitar on "Jealousy"
John Macy – pedal steel guitar
Bryan Savage – additional saxophone on "Fire in the Sky"

Background vocals
Kenny Loggins
Rosemary Butler
David Holster
The "Goodbye" Girls – Karen and Lisa

Production
Producer – Jeff Hanna and Bob Edwards

Track personnel
"Jealousy" – lead vocals: Jeff Hanna, harmony vocals: Rosemary Butler
"Too Close For Comfort" – lead vocals: Jeff Hanna, harmony vocals: Bob Carpenter, Jeff Hanna
"Fire in the Sky" – lead vocals: Jeff Hanna with Kenny Loggins
"Love is the Last Thing" – lead vocals: Bob Carpenter, harmony vocals: Jeff Hanna
"Crossfire" – lead vocals: Jeff Hanna, background vocals: Bob Carpenter, David Holster
"Circular Man" – lead vocals: Jeff Hanna, harmony vocals: Bob Carpenter
"Catch the Next Dream" – lead vocals: Jeff Hanna, harmony vocals: Bob Carpenter
"So You Run" – lead vocals: Jimmie Fadden, background vocals: Jeff Hanna, Bob Carpenter, David Holster
"Forget It!" – lead vocals: Jeff Hanna, featuring: the Doowrats and the "Goodbye" Girls
"Easy Slow" – lead vocals: Bob Carpenter, background vocals: Jeff Hanna, Bob Carpenter

Discography
 Nitty Gritty Dirt Band discography

References
All information in this article is from the LP or CD liner notes, unless otherwise noted.

1981 albums
Nitty Gritty Dirt Band albums
Liberty Records albums